Malhar is hosted annually by the students of St. Xavier's College, Mumbai, India. The Mascot for Malhar is a frog which is called Puddles. 

Malhar began in 1979. The festival includes events cultural contests in literary, performing arts and fine arts categories, along with a number of workshops on different themes.

The festival is completely managed, organized and run by the workforce which consists of 1200 volunteers and 130 people in the organizing committee. Due to Covid lockdowns, Malhar festival had to be cancelled in 2020 and was held as a one-day online event in 2021.

Theme 
Each year, the festival follows a specific theme. The theme for the year 2011 was "Labyrinth". The theme for the year 2012 was "Malhar Local", which is a play on the city of Mumbai's backbone - the railways. The theme for Malhar 2013 was "Zara Hatke", a popular phrase that encourages people to think outside the box and try something new or in a different way. 

For 2014 the theme was "A Renaissance", the era of revival in the new age. In 2015, the theme of the festival is 'Malhar: A Chronicle', with an aim to serve as a perfect platform for thousands of people to voice their untold stories. In 2016, 'Malhar: The Junction' was the theme of the festival, signifying the common point where ideas, cultures and talent meet. The Theme for Malhar 2017 was "Upside Down - Ek Atrangi Andaaz". 
The theme for Malhar 2018 was "A Time Turner". The theme for Malhar 2019 is "The Multiverse: A Nexus of Possibilities". 

The theme for year 2021 was ‘Parallax - The Legacy Re-routed’. 

The theme for year 2022 was ‘Malhar Aurora: Transcending Horizons’ which was inspired by the Greek goddess of dawn, Aurora. Malhar 2022 aimed to be a catalyst for students who strive to soar beyond their potential.

Attractions

Conclave 

Since 2009 the first day of Malhar has traditionally been the day of Conclave, a forum for interaction between eminent personalities and students. Conclave hosts a number of plenary sessions, as well as an annual Keynote address. With an array of distinguished speakers, Malhar Conclave promotes the exchange of innovative ideas, thoughts, and disciplines as well as a forum for dialogue and debate. It has hosted people such as APJ Abdul Kalam, The 14th Dalai Lama, Siddhartha Paul Tiwari, Mani Shankar Aiyar, Raghuram Rajan and many others.

Band Event 
Bands from different colleges compete to play different kinds of genres.

Social Cause 
In addition to being a college festival that aims to entertain, Malhar is also a socially conscious festival. From cleanliness drives to tree plantations, using the Malhar platform and its numerical strength of over a thousand, the workforce tackles and promotes awareness about social issues.

M.O.W. 
Malhar On Wheels is a new publicity campaign that began in 2011. Two weeks prior to Malhar, students belonging to the P.R. department go to several colleges and perform publicity gimmicks and teaser campaigns to generate interest pre-Malhar.

References

College festivals in India
Festivals in Mumbai
Festivals established in 1979
1979 establishments in India